The Huie Cliffs are steep rock cliffs rising above May Valley and forming the northwest edge of Saratoga Table, Forrestal Range, in the Pensacola Mountains of Antarctica. They were named by the Advisory Committee on Antarctic Names for Carl Huie, a technician in Antarctica, 1976–77, and a geologist with the United States Geological Survey in the Pensacola Mountains, 1978–79.

References

Cliffs of Queen Elizabeth Land